HTMS Chao Phraya (FFG-455) is the lead ship of her class of frigates for the Royal Thai Navy, a variant of the Chinese-built Type 053H2 frigate.

Design and description 
Chao Phraya has a complement of 168 personnel, including 22 officers.

As a Type 053HT frigate, the ship are armed with two 100 mm/56 Type 79 twin-barreled guns and four 37 mm Type 76 twin-barreled guns. For anti-submarine warfare, the ship is equipped with two Type 86 anti-submarine rocket launchers and two BMB depth charge racks. For surface warfare, Chao Phraya is equipped with eight C-801 anti-ship missile launchers.

In August 2020, Royal Thai Navy planned to modernizes Chao Phraya and Bangpakong to have similar capabilities to a modern offshore patrol vessel. The planned upgrade includes replacing the 100 mm guns with 76/62 automatic guns and all four 37 mm guns with a rapid-fire 30 mm autocannon, along with new combat management systems and surveillance systems.

Construction and career 
The four ships of the class was ordered on 18 July 1988. Chao Phraya was laid down in April 1989 at Hudong Shipyard, Shanghai. The ship was launched on 24 June 1990 and was commissioned on 5 April 1991. Upon the ship completion and arrival on Thailand, the shipbuilding quality were deemed to be unsatisfactory and works was needed to improve the ship. The damage control abilities were also upgraded before she entered service.

Upon entering service, Chao Phraya and her sisters were frequently used for training and rotated monthly to the Coast Guard.

The ship took part in the search and rescue effort for the missing victims of 2018 Phuket boat capsizing.

On 24–26 April 2019, Chao Phraya attended joint naval exercise with the People's Liberation Army Navy and other Southeast Asian navies in the waters off Qingdao.

References

Printed sources

External links 

Ships built in China
1990 ships
Chao Phraya-class frigates